The North Shore Channel is a drainage canal built between 1907 and 1910 to flush the sewage-filled North Branch of the Chicago River down the Chicago Sanitary and Ship Canal. The sewage carrying duty has been largely taken over by the Chicago Deep Tunnel, but there are still occasional discharges due to heavy rains.

Geography

The North Shore Channel flows from Lake Michigan, near the Bahá'í House of Worship in Wilmette, Illinois, to the North Branch of the Chicago River in Chicago.

A sluice gate usually prevents the canal from back-draining out to Lake Michigan, although the gate must be opened occasionally to prevent downstream flooding. The channel flows southwest, and then south, through or near Wilmette, Evanston, Skokie, and Lincolnwood, and into Chicago. The south end of the channel flows into the North Branch at approximately 5100 north and 3000 west in the Chicago street address numbering system. Chicago's only waterfall within the city limits, which looked like a concrete spillway, was in River Park, where the upper North Branch dropped about  through a dam into the confluence.  Starting in July 2018, the Army Corps of Engineers removed the dam, replacing it with a series of riffle pools, to allow fish to swim upstream.

Surrounded by parks and steep, wooded banks, - and the 18 hole Canal Shores Golf Course in parts of Wilmette and Evanston -  the canal provides a corridor for local wildlife. 

In 1999, the system of which the canal is a part was named a Civil Engineering Monument of the Millennium (as part of the Chicago wastewater system) by the American Society of Civil Engineers (ASCE).

General Recreation
Since the water quality improvement, fishing has become possible in the Channel. Bass and crappie are abundant, especially at the confluence of the Channel and the North Branch of the Chicago River, where the waterfall aerates the water. Canoeing and kayaking are allowed, with several put-in points along the length. 

In recent years the Channel has also become a popular rowing venue. It is home to the Chicago Rowing Foundation and the Loyola Academy and New Trier High School teams. The Channel is a great place for rowing due to its high banks that act as a shelter from the wind. The northern part of the Channel has hosted the University of Wisconsin and Syracuse University men's rowing teams for dual meets in 2016 and 2019.

In addition to water navigation, both walking and biking paths follow along nearly the entire length of the Channel.

North Shore Channel Trail
The North Shore Channel Trail is a multi-use trail that starts at Lincoln Square near West Lawrence Avenue and North Francisco Avenue and stops in Evanston at Green Bay Road. Several improvements are expected to be completed in the fall of 2019, including the Lincoln Village Pedestrian Bicycle Bridge and the 312 RiverRun and its Riverview Bridge. Other attractions along the trail include the Skokie Northshore Sculpture Park, which boasts over 60 large sculptures along the channel, the Evanston Ecology Center, and the Ladd Arboretum.

References 

Canals in Illinois
Transportation in Chicago
Geography of Chicago
Canals opened in 1910